This is a list of notable bands and solo artists that signed with UK-based record label Rough Trade Records.

Notable artists

Current 

1990s
Adam Green
Alabama Shakes
Albert Hammond Jr.
Alela Diane
Alexander
Antony and the Johnsons
Arcade Fire
Arthur Russell
Basia Bulat
Belle and Sebastian
Benjamin Booker
British Sea Power
Black Midi
 caroline
Dean Blunt
The Decemberists
The Detroit Cobras
Destroyer
Dylan LeBlanc
Eddi Reader
Edward Sharpe & The Magnetic Zeros
Emiliana Torrini
Gilla Band
God Help the Girl
Goat Girl
Gruff Rhys
The Hidden Cameras
The Hold Steady
Houndmouth
Islands
Jarvis Cocker
Jeffrey Lewis
Jenny Lewis
Jockstrap
Julian Casablancas
The Libertines
Little Joy
The Long Blondes
Micachu
Miracle Fortress
The Moldy Peaches
Monsters of Folk
The Morning Benders
My Morning Jacket
Mystery Jets
Palma Violets
Pantha du Prince
Parquet Courts
Pigs Pigs Pigs Pigs Pigs Pigs Pigs
Pinegrove
POP ETC
The Prettiots
Princess Nokia
Rachel Unthank & The Winterset
Rodrigo Amarante
Rox
Scritti Politti
Shockabilly
Skull Disco
Sleaford Mods
SOAK
Starcrawler
Strange Boys
Stray Heart
The Strokes
The Smiths
Sufjan Stevens
Super Furry Animals
Taken by Trees
The Veils
Trance
Warpaint
Yim Yames

Current and past 

 1990s
 A R Kane
 A.R.E. Weapons
 Aberfeldy
 Adam Green
 Ryan Adams
 Alabama Shakes
 Alela Diane
 Horace Andy
 Antony and the Johnsons
 Arcade Fire
 Aztec Camera
 Babyshambles
 Bacio di Tosca
 The Band of Holy Joy
 The Bats
 Baxter Dury
 Beangrowers
 Beat Happening
 Bell Orchestre
 Belle & Sebastian
 Bernard Butler
 Blue Orchids
 Brakes
 British Sea Power
 Basia Bulat
 The Burning Hell
 Butterfly Child
 Butthole Surfers
 Cabaret Voltaire
 Camper Van Beethoven
 Cardiacs
 Carter USM
 Cathedral
 Chris & Cosey
 Chris Thomas
 Jarvis Cocker
 Colorfinger
 Cornershop
 Ivor Cutler
 Dean Blunt
 The Decemberists
 The Del Fuegos
 Delays
 Delta 5
 The Detroit Cobras
 Die Krupps
 Cara Dillon
 Disco Inferno
 The Dream Syndicate
 Duffy
 Bill Drummond
 Easterhouse
 Eddi Reader
 Elizabeth Fraser
 Emiliana Torrini
 Essential Logic
 Tav Falco's Panther Burns
 The Fall
 feedtime
 The Feelies
 The Fiery Furnaces
 Galaxie 500
 Giant Sand
 Gilla Band
 The Go-Betweens.
 God Help the Girl
 Vic Godard
 Gruff Rhys
 Hal
 Albert Hammond, Jr.
 The Heart Throbs
 The Hidden Cameras
 The Hold Steady
 Houndmouth
 Howard Bilerman
 Howler
 Hope Sandoval & The Warm Inventions
 Islands
 Gregory Isaacs
 The Jackofficers
 James
Jockstrap
 Johnny Flynn & the Sussex Wit
 Freedy Johnston
 Richard H. Kirk
 David Kitt
 Kleenex
 The Last Words
 Levitation
 Jeffrey Lewis
 Jenny Lewis
 The Libertines
 LiLiPUT
 Little Joy
 Los Lobos
 The Long Blondes
 Thomas Mapfumo
 Cerys Matthews
 Massacra
 Mazzy Star
 Métal Urbain
 Micachu
 Microdisney
 The Mighty Diamonds
 Miracle Legion
 Miracle Fortress
 The Moldy Peaches
 The Monochrome Set
 The Morning Benders
 Monsters of Folk
 The Motorcycle Boy
 My Morning Jacket
 Mystery Jets
 The Mr. T Experience
 Opal
 The Ophelias
 Palma Violets
 Pantha du Prince
 Parquet Courts
 Lee Perry
 Pere Ubu
 Pinegrove
 Pooka
 The Pop Group
 Protex
 Pussy Galore
 QueenAdreena
 The Raincoats
 The Red Crayola
 Jonathan Richman
 Robert Rental
 Royal City
 Arthur Russell
 Sahotas
 Scissors for Lefty
 Scrawl
 Scritti Politti
 The Seers
 Shelleyan Orphan
 Short Dogs Grow
 Shrimp Boat
 Sleaford Mods
 The Smiths
 Soul Asylum
 Souled American
 Epic Soundtracks
 Spizzenergi
 Spring Heel Jack
 Sufjan Stevens
 Stiff Little Fingers
 Straitjacket Fits
 Strange Boys
Stray Heart
 The Strokes
 Subway Sect
 The Sundays
 Super Furry Animals
 Sweet Jesus
 Swell Maps
 Television Personalities
 They Might Be Giants
 This Heat
 Toiling Midgets
 Two Nice Girls
 James "Blood" Ulmer
 Ultramarine
 Taken by Trees
 The Virgin Prunes
 The Veils
 Venom
 Vomit Launch
 Warpaint
 Weekend
 Lucinda Williams
 Victoria Williams
 The Woodentops
 Robert Wyatt
 Young Marble Giants
 Zounds

See also
 Rough Trade Shop
 Lists of record labels

References

Sources
 Rob Young. Rough Trade. Black Dog Publishing,

External links
 

List of Rough Trade artists